Merry Christmas Baby is a compilation album by various New Zealand musicians as a fundraiser for the Royal New Zealand Plunket Society Inc. 8 of the 11 tracks are original songs. It was released on 11 October 2009.

Track listing
Producers are in brackets next to title. Artists' labels are in brackets next to artist.

Chart positions
The album debuted at number 9 on the RIANZ Top 10 Music Compilations Chart, and peaked at number 8. As at 10 December 2009, over 10,000 copies had been sold.

References

Christmas compilation albums
Compilation albums by New Zealand artists
2009 compilation albums
2009 Christmas albums
Christmas albums by New Zealand artists